The Third cabinet of Hermann Jónasson was formed 17 April 1939.

Cabinet

Inaugural cabinet

See also 

1939 establishments in Iceland
1941 disestablishments in Iceland
Hermann Jonasson, Third cabinet of
Cabinets established in 1939
Cabinets disestablished in 1941
Independence Party (Iceland)
Progressive Party (Iceland)